Maria Bedareva (born March 3, 1992 in Karaginsky District, Russia) is an alpine skier from Russia. She competed for Russia at the 2014 Winter Olympics in the alpine skiing events.

References

External links
 
 
 

1992 births
Living people
People from Kamchatka Krai
Olympic alpine skiers of Russia
Alpine skiers at the 2014 Winter Olympics
Russian female alpine skiers
Competitors at the 2015 Winter Universiade